On 4 August 2016, Pushpa Kamal Dahal of the Communist Party of Nepal (Maoist-Centre) was elected as the Prime Minister of Nepal. His candidacy was supported by the Nepali Congress, and several small parties represented in the Nepalese Parliament after a power-sharing deal with the Nepali Congress. Due to this, Dahal would become Prime Minister until the 2017 Nepalese local elections, after which he would step down in favour of the Nepali Congress.

After being sworn in, Dahal formed a new government in a coalition with the parties that supported his election, making Bimalendra Nidhi, who supported the development of the power-sharing deal his Vice Prime Minister. On several further occasions, Dahal made changes to his council of ministers. The Cabinet Dahal with its ultimate 46 ministers (including state ministers) became the second biggest council of ministers in the history of Nepal, despite the new Constitution of Nepal set the maximum amount of ministries to 25.

Ministers

Notes and references 
Notes
1. 
Dahal also led the following ministries: 
Ministry of Water Supply and Sanitation (until 19 January 2017)
Ministry of Women, Children and Social Welfare Development (until 19 January 2017)
Ministry of Livestock Development
Ministry of Science and Technology
References

Government of Nepal
Cabinet of Nepal
2016 in Nepal
2016 establishments in Nepal
2017 disestablishments in Nepal